Michał Cieślak is a Polish professional boxer who challenged for the WBC cruiserweight title in 2020 and the WBO cruiserweight title in February 2022. As of June 2020, he is ranked as the world's eighth best active cruiserweight by the Transnational Boxing Rankings Board, ninth by BoxRec and tenth by The Ring.

Professional career
Cieślak made his professional debut on 29 June 2013, scoring a four-round unanimous decision (UD) victory over Lukasz Zygmunt at the Amfiteatr in Ostróda, Poland. All three judges scored the bout 39–36.

After compiling a record of 8–0 (4 KOs) he defeated Jarno Rosberg on 22 August 2015 at the Amfiteatr in Międzyzdroje, Poland, capturing the vacant Republic of Poland Youth International cruiserweight title via first-round knockout (KO).

Cieślak was booked to face Shawn Cox on 26 September 2015, on the undercard of a Polsat Sport pay per view broadcast card. He won the fight by a first-round knockout, stopping Cox before the midway point of the opening round. Cieślak face another journeyman, Hamza Wandera, on 27 November 2015. He made quick work of his opponent, as he won the fight by a second-round technical knockout.

Cieślak faced the one-time WBC cruiserweight title challenger Francisco Palacios on 2 April 2016. He won the fight by a fourth-round technical knockout. A month later, on 28 May 2016, Cieślak faced Alexander Kubich. He won the fight by a ninth-round technical knockout. Cieślak faced Iluian Ilie on 17 September 2016, and won the fight by a second-round technical knockout.

Cieślak faced Nikodem Jezewski for the vacant IBF Baltic, and Republic of Poland cruiserweight titles on 10 December 2016 at the Hala Orbita in Wrocław, Poland. Cieślak defeated Jezewski via third-round technical knockout (TKO). On 9 January it was revealed both fighters had failed their respective drug tests. They were both subsequently suspended for one year with Cieślak's win being overturned and ruled a no contest (NC).

He returned to action in October 2017, scoring a UD victory against Ivica Bacurin. Cieślak secured another three wins, two by stoppage, before facing Ilunga Makabu for the vacant WBC cruiserweight title on 31 January 2020 at the Temporary Arena in Kinshasa, Democratic Republic of The Congo. Cieślak suffered the first defeat of his career, losing by UD, with the scorecards reading 116–111, 115–111 and 114–112.

Following his failed title bid, Cieślak was booked to face Taylor Mabika. The fight was scheduled as the main event of a PolSat Sport broadcast card on 5 December 2020. He successfully bounced back from his first professional loss with a sixth-round technical knockout of Mabika. Cieślak was next scheduled to face Yury Kashinsky on 15 May 2021. He won the fight by a first-round technical knockout.

Cieślak is scheduled to challenge the reigning WBO cruiserweight champion Lawrence Okolie in the main event of a DAZN broadcast card on 27 February 2022.

Professional boxing record

References

Living people
Year of birth missing (living people)
Date of birth missing (living people)
Polish male boxers
Cruiserweight boxers
Sportspeople from Masovian Voivodeship
People from Radom